Juan Navarro Rubinos (July 8, 1924 – January 10, 2011), better known as Juanito Navarro, was a Spanish film, theater and television actor. He died on 10 January 2011 from a cardiac arrest in Madrid at the age of 86.

Filmography

Film

References

External links 
 

1924 births
2011 deaths
Male actors from Madrid
Spanish male film actors